Maison d'Enfants Club or simply MEC is a professional basketball club based in the district of Aïn Chock, Casablanca, Morocco.

Honours & achievements
Throne Cup
 Winners (1): 1970
 Runners-up (1): 1981

References

Basketball teams in Morocco